is a district of Minato, Tokyo, Japan. There are Shibadaimon 1-chome and Shibadaimon 2-chome under the current administrative town names. It is an area under the jurisdiction of the Shiba District General Branch.

Education
Minato City Board of Education operates public elementary and junior high schools.

Shibadaimon 1-2-chōme are zoned to Onarimon Elementary School (御成門小学校) and Onarimon Junior High School (御成門中学校).

References

Districts of Minato, Tokyo